Vỡ Xương (8 December 1942), also known as Vô Hữu Xương, is a Vietnamese war artist whose career documented the Second Indochina War. He joined the People's Army of Vietnam in 1964.

Early life 
Xương’s father painted funeral portraits on a commission basis, inspiring Xương to practice art early on in his life. He also collected comic books, which he imitated in an effort to improve his drawing. He sketched and drew throughout his childhood both as a hobby and as a commissioned artist for government institutions and private individuals He did not receive any formal artistic training until after Liberation in 1975.

Career 
As a self-taught artist, he was not officially recognised as a war artist for the Democratic Republic of Vietnam (DRV) government. However, his skill was recognised by his peers and superiors and his art works were exhibited during the Vietnam War to help boost the morale of fellow soldiers. He was largely based in South Vietnam.

After the end of the Vietnam War, he finally enrolled in art school, and graduated from Ho Chi Minh City University of Fine Arts in 1981.

Towards the end of his career, he was one of a few well known artists commissioned by the Vietnam government to produce paintings to commemorate special occasions and events such as National Day, the anniversary of Điện Biên Phủ and Reunification Day. The works were the artist’s originals which were then published in larger sizes to be hung in the streets.

Notable works 
Special Ranger Dầu Tiếng (Biệt động Dầu Tiếng)
The Women's Artillery Team in Trang Bằng (Đội nữ pháo binh Trang Bằng)
Youth Volunteer in Ấp Bắc (Thanh niên xung phong Ấp Bắc)
Protect the People (Bảo vệ dân)
Split Fire (Chia lửa)
Legendary Vietnamese Mother (Huyền thoại mẹ Việt Nam)
Sac Commandos (Đặc công rừng Sác xuất kích)

Publications 

 Modern Vietnamese Visual Artists (Nghệ sĩ tạo hình Việt Nam hiện đại), 2009, Vietnam Fine Arts Association, Hanoi
 Artists in The Revolution (Kỷ Yếu các tác giả chiến tranh Cách mạng) 
 Military Art and Literature Magazine (Văn Nghệ Quân Đội)

Collections 

 Ho Chi Minh City Fine Arts Museum
Military Museum, Hanoi
 Cần Thơ Museum, Cần Thơ Province, Mekong Delta
 Military Zone 4 Museum, Bình Dương Province
 Hồ Chí Minh City Fine Arts Museum
 Tây Ninh Museum (based on the Central Office of the Southern Liberation Bureau)
 Witness Collection

Awards 
Second-class Resistance Medal
First Class Liberation Medal
First Class Honorary Medal
Medal for Vietnamese Fine Arts Career
Medal for the Protection of Vietnam's Cultural Heritage

References 

1942 births
Living people
Vietnamese artists
People of the Vietnam War